Lech Coaster is a steel roller coaster located at Legendia in Chorzów, Poland. It was the first Bermuda Blitz coaster by Dutch manufacturer Vekoma and opened on July 1, 2017. The ride also features three inversions.

Characteristics

Trains
Lech uses two trains with five cars each. Each car seats four riders, allowing a total capacity of 20 riders per train. The ride can accommodate 1,000 riders per hour.

Track
The track is black and the supports are grey.

Ride experience

Layout
Upon reaching the top of the lift hill, riders plunge down a beyond-vertical drop (unknown angle), twisting 90 degrees to the right in the process. Right after, the train turns to the right into a twisted airtime hill, which twists riders to the left. Afterwards, the train will pass through another airtime hill, followed by a corkscrew, which is located right above the main station of the ride. Riders then turn left into an over-banked turn, which then turns right. Afterwards, they pass through another twisted airtime hill, followed immediately by another corkscrew. The train then enters into an outer-banked airtime hill into a 270 degree helix to the left, followed by another twisted airtime hill into a 180 degree turnaround to the left, before stepping up into Lech Coaster's final brake run, turning to the right afterwards to return to the station.

See also
2017 in amusement parks

References

External links
Lech Coaster at the Roller Coaster DataBase
Official website (in Polish)

Roller coasters in Poland